Geoffray Durbant (born 19 May 1992) is a professional footballer who plays as a forward for  club Laval. Born in metropolitan France, he plays for the Guadeloupe national team.

Club career
Durbant is a youth academy graduate of Red Star. He made his senior debut on 18 May 2012 as a 69th minute substitute for Cédric Sabin in a 2–0 win against Vannes.

Durbant scored 15 goals for Sedan during 2019–20 Championnat National 2 season and was league top scorer when the competition was terminated due to COVID-19 pandemic in April 2020. In June 2020, he joined Bastia-Borgo.

On 7 June 2021, Laval announced the signing of Durbant on a two year deal. He helped the club achieve promotion in his first season, winning the Championnat National.

International career
Born in France, Durbant represents Guadeloupe at international level. He received his maiden call-up to the Guadeloupe national team in November 2019. He made his debut on 18 November by scoring two goals in a 10–0 CONCACAF Nations League win against the Turks and Caicos Islands.

Personal life
Durbant is of Guadeloupean and Vietnamese descent. His brother Dylan is also a footballer and plays as a goalkeeper. Their father is from Capesterre-Belle-Eau.

Career statistics

International

Scores and results list Guadeloupe's goal tally first, score column indicates score after each Durbant goal.

Honours 
Laval

 Championnat National: 2021–22

References

External links
 

1992 births
Living people
Sportspeople from Bondy
Association football forwards
Guadeloupean footballers
Guadeloupe international footballers
French footballers
French people of Guadeloupean descent
French people of Vietnamese descent
Championnat National players
Championnat National 2 players
Championnat National 3 players
Red Star F.C. players
US Roye-Noyon players
AS Vitré players
UJA Maccabi Paris Métropole players
CMS Oissel players
FC Dieppe players
US Lusitanos Saint-Maur players
CS Sedan Ardennes players
FC Bastia-Borgo players
Stade Lavallois players
Footballers from Seine-Saint-Denis